Hyalotheca is a genus of green algae, specifically of the Desmidiaceae.

References

External links

Scientific references

Scientific databases

 
 AlgaTerra database
 Index Nominum Genericorum

Desmidiaceae
Charophyta genera